Death Knows Your Name is the third full-length album from hardcore punk band The Hope Conspiracy. It was released September 19, 2006 through Deathwish Inc.

In January 2022, Deathwish will release a remastered reissue of Death Knows Your Name with updated artwork and the bonus track "Eurohell" from the band's out-of-print 2006 EP, Hang Your Cross.

Track listing

References 

2006 albums
The Hope Conspiracy albums
Albums produced by Kurt Ballou
Deathwish Inc. albums
Albums with cover art by Jacob Bannon